Freshta Kohistani  (1991 – 24 December 2020) was an Afghan Tajik woman's rights activist and a pro-democracy advocate who was assassinated at the age of 29. 

Kohistani frequently organised events in the capital, Kabul, advocating women's rights in Afghanistan. She also used social media as a platform for her message and had a large following. 

In December 2020, she was assassinated near her home by gunmen on a motorbike in the Hesa Awal Kohistan District of Kapisa province in Afghanistan; she was 29 years old. Her brother was also killed in the attack. The gunmen escaped. Before her death, Kohistani had asked for protection from the authorities after receiving threats.

References

1991 births
2020 deaths
Afghan women's rights activists
Afghan women activists
Afghan Tajik people
Assassinated Afghan people
Assassinated activists
People murdered in Afghanistan
Deaths by firearm in Afghanistan
People from Kapisa Province